Main Maike Chali Jaungi, Tum Dekhte Rahiyo (English: I Will Go To My Parents Home, You Keep Watching) is an Indian television series starring Namish Taneja, Srishti Jain and Neelu Vaghela. Created by Shoonya Square and produced by Dheeraj Sarna, it premiered on 11 September 2018 and aired on Sony TV.

Plot

Satya Devi is a divorce lawyer. Jaya, a wedding planner, and her daughter falls in love with and marries Samar Surana. Satya's interference in their life causes problems in the families. She wants Jaya's marriage to Dhruv Raichand, whom Jaya accepts. Samar's father Gauri's friend Vicky arrives from the USA and takes it upon himself to fix everything. Jaya and Samar unite. Vicky develops feelings for Satya. Amarnath, her ex-husband, and Jaya's father enter and fakes blood cancer to stay with Satya. Vicky finds out and proves his love for her who marries him.

Shalini Nehra enters, claiming Samar as her 7-year-old son Jerry's father, and provides a fake DNA report. Clueless, Samar convinces Jaya of his innocence. Shalini fakes a suicide attempt to manipulate Samar into marriage. Satya and Vicky encounter her parents who tell her that they threw her out. Shalini is exposed; the father turns out to be Samar's ex-brother-in-law, Aakash. They're arrested. Jaya and Samar take Jerry in. Satya is pregnant with Vicky's child and Jaya with Samar's child.

9 months later

Jaya delivers a daughter and Satya has a son. Everyone live happily ever after.

Cast

Main
Namish Taneja as Samar Gauri Shankar Surana: Rama and Gauri's son; Sarika's elder brother; Jaya's husband (2018–2019)
Srishti Jain as Jaya Samar Surana (née Sharma): Satya and Amarnath's youngest daughter; Vikramjeet's step-daughter; Shikha and Richa's younger sister; Samar's wife (2018–2019)
Neelu Vaghela as Advocate Satya Devi Sharma: Divorce lawyer; Savitri's daughter; Amarnath's ex-wife; Vikramjeet's wife; Jaya's mother; Kabir's grandmother (2018–2019)
Vivek Mushran as Vikramjeet "Vicky" Singh: Gauri's childhood friend; Satya's second husband; Shikha, Richa and Jaya's step-father (2019)

Recurring
Hemant Choudhary as Gauri Shankar Surana: Arvind's son; Uma's brother; Vikramjeet's friend; Rama's husband; Samar and Sarika's father
Aditi Deshpande as Rama Surana: Gauri's wife; Samar and Sarika's mother
Vaani Sharma as Sarika Surana: Rama and Gauri's daughter; Samar's younger sister; Akash's second ex-wife; Jerry's step-mother
Ashok Lokhande as Amarnath Sharma: Satya's former husband; Shikha, Richa and Jaya's biological father; Kabir's grandfather
Mahi Sharma as Shikha Suryavanshi: Satya and Amarnath's eldest daughter; Vikramjeet's step-daughter; Richa and Jaya's elder sister; Kartik's wife; Kabir's mother
Mohsin Afroz Khan as Kartik Suryavanshi: Shikha's husband; Kabir's father
Yachit Sharma as Kabir Suryavanshi: Kartik and Shikha's son
Taruna Nirankari as Richa Sinha: Satya and Amarnath's second daughter; Vikramjeet's step-daughter; Shikha and Jaya's sister; Punit's wife
Punit Dahima as Punit Sinha: Richa's husband
Vishal Chaudary as Akash Sakhuja: Shalini and Sarika's former husband; Jerry's father
Priom Gujjar as Vijay Surana: Prabha and Uma's son; Samar and Sarika's cousin; Jyoti's husband
Dolly Chawla as Jyoti Surana: Vijay's wife
Prem Nath Gulati as Arvind Shankar Surana: Gauri and Uma's father; Samar, Sarika and Vijay's grandfather
Kapil Punjabi as Uma Shankar Surana: Arvind's son; Gauri's brother; Prabha's husband; Vijay's father
Manisha Purohit as Prabha Surana: Uma's wife; Vijay's mother
Vinod Goswami as Lalwant "Lallan" Singh: Manager of Suranas
Lily Patel as Savitri Devi Khanna: Satya's mother; Shikha, Richa and Jaya's grandmother
Ambika Soni as Shalini Sejwal: Akash's first wife; Jerry's mother
Prayag Jain as Jerry Sakhuja: Shalini and Akash's son; Sarika's step-son
Ruslaan Mumtaz as Dhruv Raichand: Shanaya's former boyfriend; Jaya's suitor
Milloni Kapadia as Shanaya Raschitran: Dhruv's ex-girlfriend

References

External links
 

Sony Entertainment Television original programming
2018 Indian television series debuts
Hindi-language television shows
Indian drama television series